The 2021 Hula Bowl was a post-season college football all-star game played on January 31, 2021, with kickoff at 4:30 p.m. HST (9:30 p.m. EST), at Aloha Stadium in Honolulu, Hawaii. The game was the last of the 2020–21 bowl games and, while not restricted to FBS players, the final game of the 2020 FBS football season. Television coverage was provided by CBS Sports Network. The game was played without fans in attendance, as Aloha Stadium was "deemed unsafe to hold crowds" in December 2020.

On January 22, organizers announced that Rex Ryan would coach the Kai team, and Mike Singletary would coach the Aina team; both have served as head coaches in the National Football League (NFL). They named as their offensive coordinators former NFL quarterback Mark Sanchez for Kai and former NFL quarterback and head coach Jim Zorn for Aina. For team KAI Ronnie Jones was selected to be the Defensive Coordinator Coach and for team AINA former NFL player Abe Elimimian was selected to be the Defensive Back Coach.

Players
Player invitations were determined by the Hula Bowl Selection Committee, primarily based on "potential to make a professional Football team roster". Players were expected from "several levels of the NCAA as well as athletes from Japan, Canada, Australia, and Polynesia."

A list of accepted invites was maintained on the bowl's website. Notable players included K. J. Costello (QB, Mississippi State) and Brady White (QB, Memphis).

Game
Team Aina was uniformed in red, and Team Kai in blue. The game utilized NFL rules, with some modifications—for example, all kicks and punts were fielded only via fair catch. Due to the fair catch requirement, no onside kick could be attempted, but in its place the "kicking" team could attempt essentially a 4th-and-15 from their own 30-yard-line. This occurred once in the game, late in the 4th quarter after Team Aina scored on a pick six, but the attempt did not result in a first down.

Awards
An offensive and defensive MVP were named for each team. For Team Aina, the MVPs were running back Mekhi Sargent (Iowa) and defensive end Carlo Kemp (Michigan). For Team Kai, the MVPs were running back CJ Marable (Coastal Carolina) and cornerback Nick McCloud (Notre Dame). Offensively, Sargent had 61 yards on six rushes plus an 18-yard reception, while Marable had five carries for 17 yards including a touchdown; defensively, Kemp had four tackles and returned an interception for a touchdown, while McCloud had two interceptions with 34 return yards.

See also
 2021 NFL Draft

References

External links
 
 Hula Bowl Highlights 2021 via YouTube
 Hula Bowl 2021 Video from all days of practice via YouTube
 BTS of the 2021 Hula Bowl with coach Chad Owens via YouTube

Hula Bowl
American football competitions in Honolulu
Hula Bowl
Hula Bowl